Nikolas Bonitto (born September 26, 1999) is an American football outside linebacker for the Denver Broncos of the National Football League (NFL). He played college football at Oklahoma.

Early life and high school career
Bonitto grew up in Fort Lauderdale, Florida and attended St. Thomas Aquinas High School. He was named an Under Armour All-American as a senior. Bonitto was rated a four-star recruit and committed to play college football at Oklahoma over offers from Texas and Louisville.

College career
Bonitto played in three games as a true freshman before using a redshirt on the season. He became a starter at outside linebacker six games into his redshirt freshman season and finished the year with 43 tackles, 6.5 tackles for loss and 3.5 sacks. As a redshirt sophomore, he recorded 29 tackles with ten tackles for lost and 7.5 sacks and was named a second-team All-American by the Associated Press. Bonitto repeated as a second-team All-Big 12 selection after finishing his redshirt junior season with 39 total tackles, 15 tackles for loss, seven sacks and one forced fumble. Following the conclusion of the regular season, he announced his decision to forgo his redshirt senior season and enter the 2022 NFL draft as well as opt out of the 2021 Alamo Bowl.

Professional career

Denver Broncos
Bonitto was drafted by the Denver Broncos with the 64th pick in the second round of the 2022 NFL Draft. The Broncos used the selection previously obtained from the Los Angeles Rams in a trade for Von Miller.

References

External links
Denver Broncos bio
Oklahoma Sooners bio

1999 births
Living people
21st-century African-American sportspeople
African-American players of American football
Players of American football from Fort Lauderdale, Florida
American football linebackers
Oklahoma Sooners football players
Denver Broncos players